Eusparassus dufouri is a species of huntsman spider found in Portugal and Spain. It has been introduced to the Netherlands. It is the type species for the genus Eusparassus, and was first described by Eugène Simon in 1932.

References

Sparassidae
Spiders of Europe
Endemic insects of the Iberian Peninsula
Spiders described in 1932